Mengkibol is a main town in Kluang District, Johor, Malaysia. Mengkibol River is a major river near Mengkibol town.

Transportation
 Mengkibol railway station

Kluang District
Towns in Johor